The Bangor & District League was a football league covering the Bangor and surrounding areas in North Wales, which ran between 1930 and 1937, and 1945 and 1950. The league was a direct precursor to the Caernarfon & District League that ran between 1950 and 2014.

League History

After the collapse of Welsh National League (North) structure in 1930 junior clubs in north Caernarfonshire were left in an uncertain position. Plans to set up a new league came to fruition and the following clubs featured in the league for the first season of 1930–31, with Llechid Celts being crowned champions.

Aber
Bangor Casuals
Bangor YMCA
Bethesda Victoria Reserves
Caernarfon Conservatives
Glasinfryn Swifts
Llandegai
(Llan)Llechid Celts
Portdinorwic
Rhiwlas
Seiont Rovers
Tregarth

The league ran until 1937 when, with membership reduced to seven clubs, it disbanded. Efforts to revive the league the following year were unsuccessful. Following the Second World War the league reformed as the Gwyrfai League for 1945-46 before reverting to its original name until the end of the 1949–50 season. The competition formally changed the name to the Caernarfon & District League for the 1950–51 season to recognise the new geographical focus of the league.

Clubs in the final 1949–50 season
The following teams featured in the league in the final season played.

Abersoch Athletic
Beddgelert
Bethel
Caernarfon YMCA
Cesarea Rovers
Mountain Rangers
Nefyn United 
Seiont Rovers
Talysarn Celts
Trefor Athletic
Waenfawr

League champions
The following teams were league champions.

1930s

1930–31: – Llechid Celts
1931–32: – Tregarth
1932–33: – Menai Bridge Tigers
1933–34: – Menai Bridge Tigers
1934–35: – Llanberis
1935–36: – Portdinorwic
1936–37: – Gaerwen

1940s

1945–46: – (as the Gwyrfai League) Pwllheli British Legion
1946–47: – Llanrug United
1947–48: – Bangor Railway Institute
1948–49: – Llechid Celts
1949–50: – Mountain Rangers

Number of titles by club

Llechid Celts — 2 
Menai Bridge Tigers – 2
Bangor Railway Institute – 1
Gaerwen – 1
Llanrug United – 1
Mountain Rangers – 1
Portdinorwic – 1
Pwllheli British Legion – 1
Tregarth – 1

References

Football leagues in Wales
1930 establishments in Wales
1950 disestablishments in Wales
Sports leagues established in 1930
Sports leagues disestablished in 1950
Defunct football competitions in Wales
Caernarfonshire
Sport in Bangor, Gwynedd